Stiven Vega Londoño (born 22 May 1998) is a Colombian footballer who plays as a defender for Millonarios F.C. in Categoría Primera A.

International career
Vega made his debut for the Colombia national team on 16 January 2022 in a 2–1 home win over Honduras.

References

1998 births
Living people
Colombian footballers
Association football defenders
Millonarios F.C. players
Categoría Primera A players
People from Apartadó
Sportspeople from Antioquia Department
21st-century Colombian people